Boombox (subtitled The Remix Album 2000–2008) is a remix album by Australian pop singer Kylie Minogue. It was released by Parlophone on 17 December 2008. The album contains remixes produced between 2000 and 2008, including a remix of the previously unreleased title track, "Boombox".

Background
Most of the remixes featured on the compilation are edited down from their original length to be able to fit on the physical disc. The album's liner notes include referencing to where each remix was sourced and the catalogue number of their original release; The One (Bitrocka Mix) and Boombox (LA Riots Remix) being the exception as they are previously unreleased. Many of the remixes are sourced from rare promotional vinyl. "Kids", "Please Stay" and "Chocolate" are the only singles released by Parlophone between 2000 and 2009 that do not appear on the album in a remixed form; although "Kids" never received any remixes commissioned at the time of release.

On 11 December 2008, it was announced that the album would be released in the United States, to coincide with her nomination for the Grammy Awards of 2009.

Track listing

Charts

Release history 
 Japan: 17 December 2008
 Europe: 2 January 2009
 UK, Mexico: 5 January 2009
 Sweden 7 January 2009
 Taiwan: 9 January 2009
 Canada: 13 January 2009
 U.S.: 27 January 2009
 Italy: 6 February 2009
 Australia, Colombia: 28 February 2009
 Argentina: 3 March 2009

References

External links 
 Kylie.com – Kylie Minogue official website

Kylie Minogue remix albums
2008 remix albums
Astralwerks remix albums
Capitol Records remix albums
Electronic remix albums
Albums produced by Richard Stannard (songwriter)